The Men's South American Volleyball Championship'' which was the 17th tournament of its kind, took place in 1987 in Montevideo.

Final positions

Mens South American Volleyball Championship, 1987
Men's South American Volleyball Championships
1987 in South American sport
International volleyball competitions hosted by Uruguay 
1987 in Uruguayan sport